D508 is a state road in Hrvatsko Zagorje region of Croatia connecting Macelj border crossing to Slovenia and the A2 motorway Trakošćan interchange to the city of Lepoglava and to Trakošćan.

The road, as well as all other state roads in Croatia, is managed and maintained by Hrvatske ceste, state owned company.

Traffic volume 

Traffic is regularly counted and reported by Hrvatske ceste, operator of the road.

Road junctions and populated areas

Sources

See also
 State roads in Croatia
 Hrvatske ceste

State roads in Croatia
Krapina-Zagorje County